Dario Varga (born 2 April 1973) is a Croatian rowing coxswain. He competed in the men's coxed four event at the 1988 Summer Olympics.

References

External links
 

1973 births
Living people
Croatian male rowers
Olympic rowers of Yugoslavia
Rowers at the 1988 Summer Olympics
Sportspeople from Zadar